Elections to Manchester Borough Council were held in 1945. One third of the council was up for election, although there were several additional vacancies. The council stayed under Labour Party control.

Candidates and ward results
Below is a list of the individual wards with the candidates standing in those wards and the number of votes the candidates acquired. The winning candidate per ward is in bold.

All Saints Ward

Ardwick Ward

Beswick Ward

Blackley Ward

Bradford Ward

Cheetham Ward

Chorlton-cum-Hardy Ward

Collegiate Church Ward

Collyhurst Ward

Crumpsall Ward

Didsbury Ward

Exchange Ward

Gorton North Ward

Gorton South Ward

Harpurhey Ward

Levenshulme Ward

Longsight Ward

Medlock Street Ward

Miles Platting Ward

Moss Side East Ward

Moss Side West Ward

Moston Ward

New Cross Ward

Newton Heath Ward

Openshaw Ward

Oxford Ward

Rusholme Ward

St Anns Ward

St Clements Ward

St. Georges Ward

St.John's Ward

St Lukes Ward

St Marks Ward

St Michaels Ward

Withington Ward

Wythenshawe Ward

	
	

1945
Manchester
1940s in Manchester